Neil Goldman may refer to:

Neil Goldman and Garrett Donovan, a television writing team
Neil Goldman (Family Guy), a fictional character from Family Guy